The Shop: Uninterrupted, or simply The Shop, is an American television talk show created by Paul Rivera. It stars professional basketball star LeBron James and businessman Maverick Carter, who alongside guests have conversations and debates in a barbershop. The series premiered on HBO in the United States on August 28, 2018. On February 28, 2022, the series was renewed for a fifth season and will be moving to YouTube.

Production

Conception and development for Uninterrupted

In December 2014, James' longtime friend and business partner Maverick Carter launched Uninterrupted (stylized in all caps), a platform designed for athletes to give testimonials about their experiences.  Uninterrupted was created and produced by James' SpringHill Entertainment production company, run by Carter, and hosted on Turner Sports' Bleacher Report website. Athletes that made early contributions to Uninterrupted included Rob Gronkowski, Draymond Green, and Ronda Rousey. In December 2015, Warner Bros. and Turner Sports invested $15.8 million in the platform. By March 2017, Uninterrupted was described by Forbes as a digital media company.

James spoke on how The Shop became an idea saying, "when I was a kid, being in barbershops meant listening to adults talk about sports, clothing, politics, music, everything happened in the shop. It was so real and so candid — no one had a sense of, well I can't be myself here." Randy Mims and Paul Rivera, both business partners of James' and Carter's, first proposed The Shop.

In February 2016, during the NBA's All-Star Weekend, the first iteration of The Shop was filmed in a Toronto-based barbershop for the Uninterrupted website. The following year, another episode of The Shop was filmed in a New Orleans-based barbershop. James and Carter were joined by Golden State Warriors power forward Draymond Green, Atlanta rapper 2 Chainz, Grey's Anatomy star Jesse Williams, former New York Knicks All-Star Charles Oakley, and businessman Steve Stoute. Stoute moderated the group's discussion, which notably generated James detailing how his mother did not want him to return to the Cleveland Cavaliers in 2014. The filming premiered on the Uninterrupted platform on June 9, 2017, coinciding with Game 4 of the NBA Finals between James' Cavaliers and Green's Warriors. The New Orleans episode was optioned by ESPN as a one-off.

HBO iteration
Following the New Orleans episode, talks with HBO began in earnest. HBO then ordered a handful of episodes of The Shop, with the episode order being left vague due to James' primary focus on his basketball career. The deal with HBO did not include airing the Toronto or New Orleans episodes; the first episode for HBO was filmed in West Hollywood's Barber Surgeons Guild, in July 2018. The episode guest starred New York Giants wide receiver Odell Beckham Jr., rapper Snoop Dogg, Los Angeles Sparks forward Candace Parker, comedian Jon Stewart, New Orleans Saints running back Alvin Kamara, and Green, alongside James and Carter. The episode premiered on HBO on August 28. Further episodes aired later throughout the year. The second episode was filmed in a Washington, D.C. hair salon, which houses a separate cuttery. This episode is notable for the guest appearance from rapper Drake, who spoke on the personal troubles between him and fellow musician Kanye West. Drake was honest and offered insight to the fight that normally would not have been made known. The third and fourth episodes were also filmed in Los Angeles, with the latter notable for wide receiver Antonio Brown publicly musing on his dissatisfaction with his role on the Pittsburgh Steelers, as well as with his heated relationship with quarterback Ben Roethlisberger.

The second season of The Shop premiered on March 1, 2019, with the premiere episode being filmed in Charlotte, North Carolina, during the NBA's 2019 All-Star Weekend.

The fourth season premiered on May 28, 2021.

Episodes

Season 1

Season 2

Season 3

Season 4

Reception
Following the series' HBO premiere, Haley O'Shaughnessy of The Ringer wrote: "The setting creates a very personal facade, an opportunity to speak on fame and kids and race openly. The viewer is in on the conversation, but isn't in the conversation. Opinions on hot-topic issues that LeBron's addressed before aren’t delivered like a sermon, which are more likely to fall flat. He’s chatting with people he respects. And you feel like part of that group." O'Shaughnessy added that, "The Shop is another platform, but it isn't a pedestal. It's not a postgame press conference, where power dynamics are heavily skewed. It's an HBO show that attempts to keep a level playing field for everyone involved." Following the second episode, The Ringers Micah Peters opined, "[The Shop is] really good TV––they sip wine, they offer a side of themselves rarely seen in public, and LeBron James says swear words. Even the color palette is spare and direct. This, like most barbershops, is a space reserved strictly for real talk." Rashad Grove of The Source wrote on the series' authenticity of the Black barbershop experience, "LeBron on The Shop is showing the world what really goes down at the Black barbershop. The conversations are raw and authentic over many glasses of wine."

Meredith Blake of the Los Angeles Times published a lukewarm review of the first episode, writing, "Though the effort to capture the vibrance and tell-it-like-it-is spirit of the African American barbershop met with slightly mixed results in the first episode, The Shop is more than worth a return visit," and adding "stylish black-and-white photographs of guests arriving at the shop serve as act breaks and enhance the show’s documentary feel. But the choppy editing sometimes removes context from the conversation, offering little sense of how one subject flows to the next."

Billy Haisley of Deadspin wrote a more critical review of The Shops first episode, questioning its candidness. Haisley referred to other outlets' comments on the episode, writing," Amazing: Slate, the Washington Post, and HBO all agree that an edited, literally filtered TV program created, produced, and starring a world-famous athlete with a notoriously and meticulously maintained image is best described as 'unfiltered.' The Ringer and the Sporting News at least consulted a thesaurus before copying The Shops press release language, writing, respectfully, that the episode was 'honest' and 'candid.'" Haisley added, "The point here isn't that the things LeBron and Co. say in The Shop are insincere or fake or anything of the sort [...] Rather, the point is that the things said in The Shop are calculated, risk-free, decidedly filtered, stated for the predominant purpose of bolstering LeBron's brand. It's to position LeBron as a bold truth-teller without him having to actually tell any bold truths. And it should be treated as such." Carrie Battan of The New Yorker wrote positively of the show's candidness, however, commenting: "Theoretically, The Shop should have been yet another affirmation of our worst suspicions—that we would only ever get to see our superheroes in sanitized, strictly controlled ways. But James has offered a potent rebuttal to the argument that celebrities can't make interesting, revelatory content about themselves and their colleagues."

Battan wrote a positive review of The Shop, following its first season, as she opined positively on the series' setting "designed to generate the sense of candor, camaraderie, and intimacy that happens inside African-American barbershops." Battan conceded "[she does] not operate under the delusion that this show is a purely unfiltered, candid, and unprecedentedly revealing look at the assembled stars. There are plenty of platitudes and generalities being proffered here," but opined that The Shop "does exactly what the best celebrity profiles have always aspired to do: delight, surprise, inform."

Due to the series airing during James' basketball career, sports media outlets naturally covered The Shop, focusing on segments that dealt with James' presence in basketball. The ongoings of James' first season as a member of the Los Angeles Lakers lent themselves to discussion topics on the series, which led to further coverage by sports media. For example, Anthony Davis was the subject of rumors regarding an attempt to trade him to the Lakers at the time of his appearance on The Shop. The series also chronicled James' and fellow Lakers teammate Lonzo Ball's reactions to Magic Johnson stepping down from his Lakers front office role during the 2019 offseason; this was also noted by sports media outlets.

References

External links
  on HBO—The official website for the series in the United States.
 —A user-generated database of information related to the series.

2010s American black television series
2010s American television talk shows
2016 web series debuts
2017 web series endings
2018 American television series debuts
English-language television shows
HBO original programming
LeBron James
Television shows filmed in Los Angeles
Television shows filmed in New Orleans
Television shows filmed in North Carolina
Television series by SpringHill Entertainment
2020s YouTube series